Latini is an Italian surname. It is the Classical Latin and Italian cognate for Latins.

Geographical distribution
As of 2014, 76.5% of all known bearers of the surname Latini were residents of Italy (frequency 1:5,211), 7.3% of Brazil (1:182,112), 6.7% of the United States (1:352,784) and 5.6% of Argentina (1:50,110).

In Italy, the frequency of the surname was higher than national average (1:5,211) in the following regions:
 1. Marche (1:533)
 2. Umbria (1:894)
 3. Lazio (1:1,030)
 4. Tuscany (1:3,216)

People
Antonio Latini (1642–1692), Italian chef
Brunetto Latini (1220–1294), Italian philosopher, scholar and statesman
Franco Latini (1927–1991), Italian actor and voice actor
Ilaria Latini (born 1972), Italian voice actress
Laura Latini (1969–2012), Italian voice actress
Latino Latini (1513–1593), Italian scholar and humanist of the Renaissance
Manoela Latini Gavassi Francisco (1993—), Brazilian singer, songwriter and actress

References

 

Italian-language surnames
Surnames of Italian origin
Ethnonymic surnames